Alain Guy Chevrier (born April 23, 1961) is a Canadian former ice hockey goaltender.

Junior Hockey and Collegiate Career 

As a youth, Chevrier played in the 1974 Quebec International Pee-Wee Hockey Tournament with a minor ice hockey team from Cornwall, Ontario.  He took a first step into junior hockey in 1978-79 playing at Canada's highest tier for his hometown Cornwall Royals of the Quebec Major Junior Hockey League before moving to the Ottawa Jr. Senators of the Central Junior A Hockey League the following season.  At the time, playing major juniors in Canada did not violate NCAA amateur eligibility, and Chevrier elected to move to US college hockey, playing for the Miami University in Oxford, Ohio beginning in 1980.

Alain was a regular starter for the new Miami program, which only started NCAA Division I play in 1978, earning four letters under coach Steve Cady.  Chevrier was named the team Rookie of the Year for the 1980-81 season, honored by the Blue Line Club in his senior season, and is among the all-time leaders at Miami with 2,440 saves in his 4-year collegiate career.  Chevrier was the first Miami hockey player inducted into the Miami Hall of Fame in 1992.

Professional career

Undrafted out of Miami, Chevrier signed with the Fort Wayne Komets of the International Hockey League (IHL), earning playing time over a pool of goaltenders, playing 56 games, going 26-21-7 with 3.62 GAA.  His play earned the notice of the New Jersey Devils, where he'd spend the next three NHL seasons, becoming the starter  for the 1986-87 season, and splitting time in 1987-88 with Bob Sauve and Olympian Sean Burke, with Chevrier posting a solid 3.77 GAA.

On March 9, 1986, Gilbert Perreault scored the 500th goal of his NHL career vs Chevrier.

Chevrier was traded in 1988 to the Winnipeg Jets along with a 7th round pick for Steve Rooney. Chevrier would be in a goalie logjam in Winnipeg, playing only 22 games, going 8-8-2, with a 4.29 GAA, before being traded in January 1989 to the Chicago Blackhawks for a fourth-round pick in the draft. Chevrier would be thrown into the starting role thanks to struggles of Darren Pang and rookie Ed Belfour and Alain had a hot hand in 27 games going 13-11-2 with a 3.51 GAA and would be the starter for the 1989 Stanley Cup Playoffs with a stellar 2.61 post-season GAA, getting the Hawks to the Campbell Conference finals before losing to the eventual Stanley Cup champion Calgary Flames.

Starting the next season again with Chicago, Chevrier was traded in March 1990 to the Pittsburgh Penguins for future considerations, and Chevrier saw limited action.  For the 1990-91 season, Chevrier got picked up by the Detroit Red Wings as a free agent, but only saw three games of action (0-2-0) in the NHL as he would spend most of the time in the IHL with the San Diego Gulls.  Chevrier retired after the 1990-91 season.

Personal life 

After finishing his playing career, Chevrier moved to Boca Raton, Florida, where he lives with his family and operates an insurance business.

Career statistics

Regular season and playoffs

References

Miami Hockey 2005-06 Media Guide (see pg. 96)

External links
 
 Alain Chevrier @ hockeygoalies.org

1961 births
Canadian ice hockey goaltenders
Chicago Blackhawks players
Cornwall Royals (QMJHL) players
Detroit Red Wings players
Florida Panthers announcers
Fort Wayne Komets players
Ice hockey people from Ontario
Living people
Miami RedHawks men's ice hockey players
New Jersey Devils players
Pittsburgh Penguins players
San Diego Gulls (IHL) players
Sportspeople from Cornwall, Ontario
Sportspeople from Wheaton, Illinois
Undrafted National Hockey League players
Winnipeg Jets (1979–1996) players